Nika Dzalamidze (born 6 January 1992) is a Georgian footballer who plays as a left winger for FC Rustavi.

Career

Club
On 18 December 2009 PFC CSKA Moscow signed the 17-year Georgian midfielder on loan from FC Baia Zugdidi.

In February 2011, he was loaned to Widzew Łódź on a one-year deal.

References

External links
 
 
 

1992 births
Living people
Footballers from Georgia (country)
Association football midfielders
Expatriate footballers from Georgia (country)
Georgia (country) international footballers
Georgia (country) under-21 international footballers
FC Zugdidi players
Expatriate footballers in Russia
Expatriate sportspeople from Georgia (country) in Russia
PFC CSKA Moscow players
Expatriate footballers in Poland
Ekstraklasa players
Expatriate sportspeople from Georgia (country) in Poland
Widzew Łódź players
Jagiellonia Białystok players
Süper Lig players
Çaykur Rizespor footballers
Expatriate footballers in Romania
Liga I players
ASC Daco-Getica București players
Expatriate footballers in Turkey
Footballers from Tbilisi
FC Baltika Kaliningrad players
FC Metalurgi Rustavi players